Alex Ferrari (born 1 July 1994) is an Italian professional footballer who plays as a defender for Cremonese on loan from Serie A club Sampdoria.

Club career
Ferrari was born in Modena. He played for lowly Modena Est, before joining Bologna's youth setup in 2002, aged eight, and was promoted to the Primavera squad in the mid–2011.

On 3 December 2013, Ferrari made his first-team debut, coming on as a second-half substitute in a 1–2 home loss against Siena, for the season's Coppa Italia. On 14 January of the following year he was loaned to Crotone.

In January 2017 he signed a new -year contract with Bologna. He moved on loan to Hellas Verona on 27 January 2017, lasting until the end of the season. On 12 July 2017, his loan at Verona was extended until June 2018, with an obligation to buy.

On 13 June 2018, Ferrari signed to Serie A club Sampdoria, on loan until 30 June 2019 with an option to buy. The deal was later turned permanent. On 2 January 2023, he joined fellow Serie A club Cremonese on loan until the end of the 2022–23 season.

International career
Ferrari made his debut with the Italy U21 on 2 June 2016, in a friendly match against France.

In June 2017, he was included in the Italy under-21 squad for the 2017 UEFA European Under-21 Championship by manager Luigi Di Biagio. He made his only appearance of the tournament In Italy's second group match on 21 June, a 3–1 defeat to Czech Republic. Italy were eliminated in the semi-finals following a 3–1 defeat to Spain on 27 June.

Career statistics

Club

References

External links

1994 births
Living people
Sportspeople from Modena
Association football defenders
Italian footballers
Italy youth international footballers
Italy under-21 international footballers
Bologna F.C. 1909 players
F.C. Crotone players
Hellas Verona F.C. players
U.C. Sampdoria players
U.S. Cremonese players
Serie A players
Serie B players
Footballers from Emilia-Romagna